Chemokine (C-C motif) ligand 26 (CCL26) is a small cytokine belonging to the CC chemokine family that is also called Eotaxin-3, Macrophage inflammatory protein 4-alpha
(MIP-4-alpha), Thymic stroma chemokine-1 (TSC-1), and IMAC.  It is expressed by several tissues including heart, lung and ovary, and in endothelial cells that have been stimulated with the cytokine interleukin 4.  CCL26 is chemotactic for eosinophils and basophils and elicits its effects by binding to the cell surface chemokine receptor CCR3.  This gene for chemokine is located on human chromosome 7.

References

External links
 
 

Cytokines